The 2014 United States Senate election in North Carolina took place on November 4, 2014, to elect a member of the United States Senate to represent the state of North Carolina, concurrently with other elections to the United States Senate in other states and elections to the United States House of Representatives and various state and local elections. On May 6, 2014, the primary took place.

Incumbent Democratic Senator Kay Hagan ran for re-election to a second term in office. She faced Republican Thom Tillis, the Speaker of the North Carolina House of Representatives, and Libertarian Sean Haugh, his party's nominee for the U.S. Senate in 2002, in the general election. Tillis defeated Hagan by about 45,000 votes and a margin of 1.6%. This made the election the second-closest race of the 2014 Senate election cycle, behind only the election in Virginia.

Democratic primary

Candidates

Declared 
 Kay Hagan, incumbent U.S. Senator
 Ernest T. Reeves, retired U.S. Army captain
 Will Stewart, small business owner

Withdrew 
 Fred Westphal, retired University of Miami professor and political activist

Results

Republican primary

Candidates 
The eight Republican candidates on the 2014 U.S. Senate primary ballot were the most in party history in North Carolina, more than the seven on the ballot in the 2002 Republican primary won by Elizabeth Dole.

Declared 
 Ted Alexander, former mayor of Shelby
 Alex Bradshaw
 Greg Brannon, physician and Tea Party activist
 Heather Grant, nurse practitioner
 Mark Harris, pastor of First Baptist Church of Charlotte and president of the Baptist State Convention of North Carolina
 Edward Kryn, retired physician
 James Snyder Jr., former state representative, candidate for U.S. Senate in 2002 and nominee for lieutenant governor in 2004
 Thom Tillis, Speaker of the North Carolina House of Representatives

Withdrew 
 Terry Embler, police detective
 Bill Flynn, radio host and candidate for North Carolina's 6th congressional district in 2012

Declined 
 Philip E. Berger, President pro tempore of the North Carolina Senate
 Cherie K. Berry, North Carolina Commissioner of Labor
 Peter S. Brunstetter, state senator
 James P. Cain, attorney and former United States Ambassador to Denmark
 Renee Ellmers, U.S. Representative
 Dan Forest, Lieutenant Governor of North Carolina
 Virginia Foxx, U.S. Representative
 George Holding, U.S. Representative
 Patrick McHenry, U.S. Representative
 Sue Myrick, former U.S. Representative and former Mayor of Charlotte
 Robert Pittenger, U.S. Representative
 Kieran Shanahan, attorney
 Lynn Wheeler, former member of the Charlotte City Council and former mayor pro tempore of Charlotte

Endorsements

Polling 
Primary

Runoff

Results

Libertarian primary

Candidates

Declared 
 Tim D'Annunzio, businessman, Republican candidate for NC-08 in 2010 and Republican nominee for NC-04 in 2012
 Sean Haugh, pizza delivery man and nominee for the U.S. Senate in 2002

Results

Other parties

Certified write-in candidates 
 Barry Gurney, small business owner
 John W. Rhodes, former Republican state representative
 David Waddell, Constitution Party member and former Indian Trail town councilman

General election

Candidates 
 Kay Hagan (D), incumbent U.S. Senator
Sean Haugh (L), pizza delivery man and nominee for the U.S. Senate in 2002
 Thom Tillis (R), Speaker of the North Carolina House of Representatives

Outside spending 
In July 2014, Jim Morrill of The Charlotte Observer calculated that as of the end of June, more than $26 million had been spent by outside advocacy groups on the election, with $17 million of it attacking Hagan or supporting Tillis and less than $9 million supporting Hagan or attacking Tillis. By contrast, outside groups spent $25 million during the entire 2008 election. He reported that only $11.4 million had been reported to the FEC, with the rest of the "dark money" coming from groups that did not have to disclose their donors. 27% of the money spent supporting Tillis came from groups required to disclose their donors whereas 69% of the money supporting Hagan did so.

OpenSecrets placed the final cost of outside spending at $8.5 million for Hagan and $35.5 million attacking Tillis, and $13.7 million for Tillis and $20.9 million attacking Hagan, placing the totals by candidate at $44 million for Hagan, and $34.6 million for Tillis.

Debates 
Three televised debates between the candidates were held: the first on September 3 moderated by Norah O'Donnell of CBS, the second on October 7 moderated by George Stephanopoulos of ABC, and the third (the only one to feature Sean Haugh) on October 9 moderated by Jon Evans of WECT-TV.

Video of the first debate is available here, with the second here and the third here.

Predictions

Polling

Results

See also 

 2014 United States Senate elections
 2014 United States elections

References

External links 
 U.S. Senate elections in North Carolina, 2014 at Ballotpedia
 Campaign contributions at OpenSecrets
 Kay Hagan for U.S. Senate
 Thom Tillis for U.S. Senate
 Sean Haugh for U.S. Senate
 Barry Gurney for U.S. Senate
 John W. Rhodes for U.S. Senate
 David Waddell for U.S. Senate

2014
North Carolina
United States Senate